The Pearl Jam 2007 European Tour was a concert tour by the American rock band Pearl Jam.

History
The tour consisted of thirteen dates in Europe, including several festival appearances. Pearl Jam's performance on June 15, 2007 at the Heineken Jammin' Festival was cancelled due to a strong tornado that hit the park. The entire standing area for the show in London, England at Wembley Arena on June 18, 2007 was exclusively for members of the Pearl Jam fanclub. This was the band's only tour scheduled for 2007. The band elected not to release official bootlegs for this tour.

Opening acts
The Futureheads — (June 12, June 21 & June 26)
Linkin Park — (June 13)
Coma — (June 13)
Idlewild — (June 18)
Interpol — (June 21)
Incubus — (June 28)
Kings of Leon — (June 28)
Satellite Party — (June 28)

Tour dates

Festivals and other miscellaneous performances
This concert was a part of "Optimus Alive!"
This concert was a part of "Festimad"
This concert was a part of "Nova Rock Festival"
This concert was a part of "Southside Festival"
This concert was a part of "Hurricane Festival"
This concert was a part of "Rock Werchter"

Cancellations and rescheduled shows

Band members
Pearl Jam
Jeff Ament – bass guitar
Stone Gossard – rhythm guitar
Mike McCready – lead guitar
Eddie Vedder – lead vocals, guitar
Matt Cameron – drums

Additional musicians
Boom Gaspar – Hammond B3 and keyboards

Gallery

References

2007 concert tours
Pearl Jam concert tours